Rodney Lee Achter (born February 14, 1961), better known as Rod Achter, is a former gridiron football wide receiver. Achter was drafted by the Minnesota Vikings in the ninth round of the 1983 NFL Draft with the 239th overall pick. He later played for the Ottawa Rough Riders in 1984, recording three catches for 10 yards in two regular season games. He is the granduncle of American ice hockey goaltender, Tyler James Hardwick.

References 

1961 births
Living people
American football wide receivers
Canadian football wide receivers
Players of American football from Ohio
Toledo Rockets football players
Minnesota Vikings players
Ottawa Rough Riders players
People from Oregon, Ohio
Players of Canadian football from Ohio